Miscanthus sacchariflorus, the Amur silvergrass, is a grass native to temperate Northeast Asia.

Culms are erect,  –  in height and  –  in diameter.

References

External links 
 
 
 GrassBase - The Online World Grass Flora
 GBIF entry
 USDA Plants Profile entry

sacchariflorus
Grasses of Asia
Grasses of China
Flora of Korea
Grasses of Russia
Flora of Northeast Asia
Flora of the Russian Far East